The United States U-23 men's national soccer team, also known as the United States men's Olympic soccer team, is a youth soccer team operated under the auspices of U.S. Soccer. Its primary role is qualification into and competition at the quadriennial Olympic Football Tournament, the next of which is to be held during the 2024 Summer Olympics in Paris, France. The team's most recent major tournament was the 2020 edition at the Tokyo Olympics, in which the United States team did not qualify. Their most recent qualfiication was the tournament at the 2008 Summer Olympics, where the team was eliminated in the group stage.

In accordance with FIFA regulations, the roster can be augmented with three "overage" players during Olympic competition.

History
Men's Olympic soccer became an under-23 competition for the 1992 Summer Olympics in Barcelona, Spain. In the group stage, the Americans defeated Kuwait but lost to Italy and only managed a draw with Poland. As a result, they were eliminated in the first round. Several U.S. players on the roster, however, would go on to have a major influence with the United States men's national soccer team in the 1994 FIFA World Cup, which the United States would host.

The 1996 Summer Olympics in Atlanta, Georgia would be the first time that teams could add overage players to their rosters.  Being the host nation and with Major League Soccer in the middle of its inaugural season,  the USSF tapped then-D.C. United head coach Bruce Arena to manage the Olympic team.  They would fall short again, however, as a loss to eventual-silver medalists Argentina offset a win against Tunisia and a draw with Portugal.

The 2000 Summer Olympics in Sydney, Australia marked a significant turnaround in the fortunes of the team.  This time, the United States, led by head coach Clive Charles, won their group on goal difference on the strength of draws with the Czech Republic and eventual-gold medalists Cameroon and a win over Kuwait.  A tense quarterfinal match against Japan ended in a penalty shoot-out which the United States won.  Losses to Spain in the semifinals and Chile in the bronze medal match left the Americans short of medal dreams, but the fourth-place finish in a sixteen-team tournament was the program's greatest youth team.

The team did not compete at the 2004 Summer Olympics in Athens, Greece; the United States, led by head coach Glenn Myernick, failed to qualify after a defeat to Mexico in the semifinals of the 2004 CONCACAF Men's Pre-Olympic Tournament.

In late 2006, former Chivas USA head coach Bob Bradley was given the reins to both the senior national team and under-23 national team. His tenure would be brief as his elevation to full-time head coach of the senior team would result in him handing control of the under-23 team to his assistant head coach, Piotr Nowak. Under Nowak, the United States qualified for the 2008 Summer Olympics after a 3–0 win over Canada in the 2008 CONCACAF Men's Pre-Olympic Tournament, thanks to goals by Freddy Adu and Sacha Kljestan.  The Olympics began promisingly; the Americans defeated Japan and led Holland late. However, a stoppage time goal equalized for the Dutch, and the Americans followed up with a loss to Nigeria.

Under the leadership of new coach Caleb Porter in the 2012 CONCACAF Men's Olympic Qualifying Tournament, the Americans defeated Cuba but were then beaten by Canada and surrendered a late lead against El Salvador, causing them to miss the Olympics for the second time in three tournaments.

Coaches
 1988–1992: Lothar Osiander
 1994–1995: Timo Liekoski
 1995–1996: Bruce Arena
 1996–2003: Clive Charles
 2003–2004: Glenn Myernick
 2006–2007: Bob Bradley
 2007–2009: Piotr Nowak
 2011–2012: Caleb Porter
 2013–2014: Tab Ramos
 2015–2016: Andreas Herzog
 2019–present: Jason Kreis

Recent schedule and results
The following is a list of match results from the previous 12 months, as well as any future matches that have been scheduled.

2020 CONCACAF Men's Olympic Qualifying Championship

The 2020 CONCACAF Men's Olympic Qualifying Championship was held on March 18–30, 2021.

Players

Current squad
The following 20 players were named to the roster for the 2020 CONCACAF Men's Olympic Qualifying Championship.

Caps and goals are updated as of March 28, 2021, after the match against Honduras.

Recent call-ups
The following players have been called up for the team within the last twelve months.

Notes:
 : Preliminary squad
 : Withdrew due to injury
 : Withdrew due to other reasons

Overage players in Olympic Games

Honors
 CONCACAF Olympic Qualifying Tournament
 Winners (1): 1992
 Runners-up (2): 2000, 2008
 Third place (1): 2015
 Pan American Games
 Bronze medalists (1): 1999

Top goalscorers

Competitive record
 Champions   Runners-up   Third place   Fourth place

Olympic Games

Pan American Games

Pre-Olympic Tournament

See also
 United States Soccer Federation
 United States men's national soccer team
 United States men's national under-17 soccer team
 United States men's national under-20 soccer team
 Football at the Summer Olympics

References

External links
 

Soc
North American national under-23 association football teams
 
U23
U23